In the 1998–99 season, USM Alger is competing in the Super Division for the 19th time, as well as the Algerian Cup.  It is their 4th consecutive season in the top flight of Algerian football. They will be competing in Ligue 1 and the Algerian Cup. In 1998–99 Algerian Cup against JS Kabylie, the two teams met for the first time in the final of the Algerian Cup at Stade 5 Juillet 1962 and in the first final to be attended by the new president of the country Abdelaziz Bouteflika and ended with the victory of USM Alger with two goals record by Billel Dziri and the former player in JS Kabylie Tarek Hadj Adlane To be the fourth Cup of USMA, Before that in the Semi-finals against MC Alger, there was a great controversy over the way the game was played, where it was supposed to play from two games, but the Ministry of Youth and Sports decided to play the two games in Stade du 5 Juillet, Saïd Allik President of USMA, refused this insisting that each team plays in his stadium and Stade du 5 Juillet, he was the official stadium of MC Alger, after which the Minister of Youth and Sports Mohamed Aziz Derouaz rejected this request and insisted that he play on Stade du 5 Juillet for security reasons. On the day of the match, USM Alger went to Omar Hamadi Stadium and MC Alger and the referees to Stade du 5 Juillet. Minister of the Interior and Local Authorities at that time Abdelmalek Sellal called Allik to find a solution to this problem, His response was that there were two solutions the first is that each team plays in its stadium Or hold one game in a neutral stadium, and Allik proposes Stade du 19 Mai 1956 in Annaba, but because of the black decade and since both of them are from the capital, it was decided to hold it in Stade du 5 Juillet.

Squad list
Players and squad numbers last updated on 8 January 1999.Note: Flags indicate national team as has been defined under FIFA eligibility rules. Players may hold more than one non-FIFA nationality.

Competitions

Overview

Super Division

League table

Results summary

Results by round

Matches

Algerian Cup

African Cup Winners' Cup

Quarter-final

CAF Cup

First round

Second round

Squad information

Appearances and goals

|-

Goalscorers
Includes all competitive matches. The list is sorted alphabetically by surname when total goals are equal.

Transfers

In

Out

Notes

References

USM Alger seasons
Algerian football clubs 1998–99 season